Ahmed Ishtiaq Mubarak (6 February 1948 – 9 August 2013) was a Malaysian hurdler. He competed in the 1968, 1972 and 1976 Summer Olympics. He was also the flag bearer for Malaysia at the 1976 Summer Olympics.

References

1948 births
2013 deaths
Athletes (track and field) at the 1968 Summer Olympics
Athletes (track and field) at the 1972 Summer Olympics
Athletes (track and field) at the 1976 Summer Olympics
Malaysian male hurdlers
Olympic athletes of Malaysia
Athletes (track and field) at the 1974 British Commonwealth Games
Athletes (track and field) at the 1978 Commonwealth Games
Commonwealth Games competitors for Malaysia
Asian Games medalists in athletics (track and field)
Athletes (track and field) at the 1966 Asian Games
Athletes (track and field) at the 1974 Asian Games
Athletes (track and field) at the 1978 Asian Games
Asian Games silver medalists for Malaysia
Asian Games bronze medalists for Malaysia
Medalists at the 1966 Asian Games
Medalists at the 1974 Asian Games
Southeast Asian Games medalists in athletics
Southeast Asian Games gold medalists for Malaysia